Heroes is a 1977 American drama film directed by Jeremy Paul Kagan and starring Henry Winkler, Sally Field and Harrison Ford (in his first post-Star Wars role, but filmed before that movie's release).

Winkler plays a Vietnam War vet with PTSD who sets about finding the men from his unit who had served in Vietnam. Field plays his at-first-reluctant girlfriend and Ford plays one of the former soldiers in his unit, now a dysfunctional stock car driver in Sedalia, Missouri, who keeps a stolen M16 rifle in the trunk of his car.

Plot
Jack Dunne (Winkler), an amnesiac Vietnam veteran most likely suffering from a severe case of PTSD , escapes a mental ward in New York City intent on starting a business as a worm farmer in Eureka, California.

At the bus station, he accidentally meets Carol Bell (Field), a woman unsure of her engagement to a man toward whom she has confused feelings.  Initially annoyed by Jack, Carol gradually warms to him as they set off on a trip through middle America towards Northern California:  during the journey she has time to reflect on her impending nuptials as Jack tries to locate his three war buddies hoping to enlist them in his dream to start a worm farm.

It becomes clear that the first two friends Jack and Carol locate are in too poor condition to do much work of any kind. When a visit to the parents of the third results in the disclosure that the friend had died in the war, Jack, who knew as much but was in denial, relives the battlefield trauma of his buddy's death. Finally, Carol's compassion and caring enable Jack to come to terms with reality.

Cast
 Henry Winkler as Jack Dunne
 Sally Field as Carol Bell
 Harrison Ford as Ken Boyd
 Val Avery as Bus Driver
 Olivia Cole as Jane Adcox
 Hector Elias as Dr. Elias
 Dennis Burkley as Gus
 Tony Burton as Chef
 Michael Cavanaugh as Peanuts
 Stuart Margolin (uncredited) Station Wagon Driver
 Rance Howard as Veterans Hospital Orderly

Production
The film was based on an original autobiographical script by James Carabatsos, a Vietnam veteran who also wrote such military-themed films as Heartbreak Ridge and Hamburger Hill. He sent it to the agent of Henry Winkler, then hugely popular because of Happy Days. Winkler loved the script and showed it to two producers, Lawrence Turman and David Foster, who wanted to work with him. They presented it as a package to Ned Tanen at Universal who agreed to finance the movie. David Freeman did a rewrite of the film which was shot over 35 days.

Reception
The film was difficult to sell owing to its subject matter and the fact Winkler was playing a character so different from the Fonz.

Critical response
On Rotten Tomatoes, Heroes holds a rating of 27% from 15 reviews. On Metacritic the film has a weighted average score of 35 out of 100, based on 7 critics, indicating "generally unfavorable reviews".

When the movie was released on VHS/DVD, the ending song, "Carry On Wayward Son" by Kansas - their first Top 20 hit - was replaced by an instrumental song, as the rights to the song had not been obtained.  This greatly diminished the emotional impact of the final scene.  However, most TV airings still contain the original soundtrack, and, in fact, the inclusion of the Kansas song has allowed "Carry On Wayward Son" to remain popular since its release, being certified Gold in 1990, and frequently still heard on the radio.

Box office
The movie was a box office success, grossing $33.5 million on a $3.1 million budget, and opened at number 1 at the U.S. box office.

Accolades
Henry Winkler received a Golden Globe award nomination for Best Actor in a Drama film. He also received the corresponding BAFTA nomination. It received another BAFTA nomination, for Best Musical Score.

References

External links
 
 
 

1977 films
1977 comedy-drama films
American comedy-drama films
Anti-war films about the Vietnam War
Films scored by Jack Nitzsche
Films directed by Jeremy Kagan
1977 directorial debut films
Universal Pictures films
1977 comedy films
1977 drama films
Films about veterans
1970s English-language films
1970s American films